AmIAnnoying.com (AIA) is a website that allows users to vote on celebrities based on their annoyance factors. It has more than 30,000 profiles of public figures and is the largest on-going celebrity polling site on the internet.

Overview
While most of the entries on the site consist of individuals, groups such as bands, sports teams and television series have their own entries on the site. Even AmIAnnoying.com has its own profile, where in its early years it got mostly annoying votes.

AIA keeps track of the votes cast and produces two on-going lists of the 100 celebrities who have the highest and lowest annoying percentages. Each week, AIA takes the top 25 in both lists and use them to compile the year-end "most annoying of the year" and "least annoying of the year" lists. Though in years past the voting totals were not reset until the end of the year, they started to reset the polls each week in 2006. AIA has been used by several media outlets to measure the public perception of the celebrity in their articles. The poll is not scientific and there have been instances of ballot stuffing despite the five-vote-per-visit rule given by AIA.

Lawyers representing the Church of Scientology threatened legal action for the usage of a picture of its founder L. Ron Hubbard, forcing AIA to alter the picture. Due to a family request, AIA also removed a profile of Matthew Shepard and it no longer accepts profiles of those famous only because they were murdered.

At the end of 2004, the tabloid magazine Star had an issue devoted to the "Most Annoying People of 2004", with Britney Spears and Paris Hilton at the top of the list. It had no affiliation with AmIAnnoying.com and it is not known if Star lifted that idea from the site or it was merely coincidental. AIA used the slogan "The Original and Interactive Annoying Celebrity Poll" after the Star issue came out.

AmIAnnoying.com was featured in the 2007 documentary Heckler.

It was announced on April 24, 2010, that co-founder Bruce Goldman had died earlier that week.

Annual lists

Most Annoying of the Year

Least Annoying of the Year

References

External links
 Am I Annoying
 CNN article on AmIAnnoying.com

Internet properties established in 2000
American entertainment websites